Maynila is a Philippine television drama romance anthology show broadcast by GMA Network. Hosted by Lito Atienza, it premiered on December 13, 1999 on network's weekday afternoon line up. In December 2020, Atienza decided to put the show in hiatus.

The show is streaming online on YouTube.

Overview
Presented as an anthology, Maynila is a series of inspiring stories of people with everyday challenges that affect Manila residents.

Episodes

Hosts
Lito Atienza - former DENR Secretary, Manila mayor & BUHAY Partylist representative.
Ali Atienza - sit-in host while his father was running for Mayor of Manila in 2010.
Chi Atienza-Valdepenas (2004; since 2016)

Production
Principal photography was halted in March 2020 due to the enhanced community quarantine in Luzon caused by the COVID-19 pandemic. The show resumed its programming on July 11, 2020.

Accolades

References

External links
 

1999 Philippine television series debuts
2020 Philippine television series endings
Filipino-language television shows
GMA Network original programming
Philippine anthology television series
Television productions suspended due to the COVID-19 pandemic
Television shows set in Manila